Miguel Jaime (born November 17, 1995) is an American soccer midfielder who currently plays for Penn FC in the USL.

Career

Youth and college
Jaime played four years of college soccer at Florida Gulf Coast University between 2014 and 2017, making 67 appearances for the Eagles, scoring 5 goals and tallying 9 assists.

While at college, Jaime appeared for USL PDL sides Ocean City Nor'easters and Colorado Rapids U-23.

Professional
Jaime signed with United Soccer League side Penn FC on March 5, 2018.

References

External links
 

1995 births
Living people
American soccer players
Florida Gulf Coast Eagles men's soccer players
Ocean City Nor'easters players
Colorado Rapids U-23 players
Penn FC players
Association football midfielders
Soccer players from Colorado
USL League Two players
USL Championship players